Santiáu de Sierra is one of 54 parish councils in Cangas del Narcea, a municipality within the province and autonomous community of Asturias, in northern Spain. 

Its villages include: Becerrales, Cadrixuela, La Castañal, Bendieḷḷu, Nandu, Parrondu, Santiagu and Siasu.

References

Parishes in Cangas del Narcea